Lisa Marie Piccirillo (born 1990 or 1991) is an American mathematician who works on geometry and low-dimensional topology. In 2020, Piccirillo published a mathematical proof in the journal Annals of Mathematics determining that the Conway knot is not a slice knot, answering an unsolved problem in knot theory first proposed over fifty years prior by English mathematician John Horton Conway. In July 2020, she became an assistant professor of mathematics at Massachusetts Institute of Technology.

Early life
Piccirillo was raised in Greenwood, Maine and attended Telstar Regional High School in Bethel, Maine. Her mother was a middle school math teacher.  As a child, she had many hobbies, such as riding dressage, being involved in her church's youth group and she participated in drama and band in school.

Education 
Piccirillo earned a B.S. in mathematics from Boston College in 2013 and a PhD in low-dimensional topology at the University of Texas at Austin under the supervision of John Luecke in 2019, followed by postdoctoral research at Brandeis University. Boston College professor Elisenda Grigsby cited Piccirillo's creativity as contributing to her success, adding that Piccirillo did not fit the mold of a "standard golden child math prodigy" during her undergraduate studies.

Work 

The slice property of the Conway knot was a long-standing unsolved problem in knot theory. The knot was named after its discoverer, English mathematician John Horton Conway, who first wrote about the knot in 1970. The Conway knot was determined to be topologically slice in the 1980s; however, the nature of its sliceness, and whether or not it was smoothly slice, eluded mathematicians for decades up until Piccirillo's breakthrough. Piccirillo's work on the Conway knot completed the classification of slice knots with under thirteen crossings, as the Conway knot had been the last outstanding knot in its group fully unclassified.

Piccirillo first learned of the Conway knot problem in 2018 at a conference on low-dimensional topology and geometry. She was a graduate student at the time and spent less than a week working on the knot in her free time before finding an answer. The Washington Post reported that her proof had been "hailed as a thing of mathematical beauty, and her work could point to new ways to understand knots." Following the publication of Piccirillo's proof in Annals of Mathematics, she was offered a tenure-track position at the Massachusetts Institute of Technology set to begin fourteen months after the completion of her doctorate.

Recognition
In association with the 2021 Breakthrough Prizes, Piccirillo was awarded one of three 2021 Maryam Mirzakhani New Frontiers Prizes, for early-career achievements by a woman mathematician. The other two winners were Nina Holden and Urmila Mahadev. She was also awarded a 2021 Clay Research Fellowship for "her work in low-dimensional topology" and a 2021 Sloan Research Fellowship.

She was also counted as one of "The world's top 50 thinkers for the Covid-19 age" by UK magazine Prospect.

References

External links
 Official site

21st-century American mathematicians
21st-century women mathematicians
American women mathematicians
Morrissey College of Arts & Sciences alumni
Living people
Massachusetts Institute of Technology School of Science faculty
Topologists
University of Texas at Austin alumni
University of Texas at Austin College of Natural Sciences alumni
Year of birth missing (living people)
Brandeis University faculty
People from Greenwood, Maine
21st-century American women